The ancient stepwell is located in Borsad town in Anand district, Gujarat, India. It was built in 1497 by Vasu Soma and his family. It is seven story stepwell and has 13 arches. The water is reached by flight of steps. It is Monument of National Importance (N-GJ-69) protected by Archeological Survey of India.

Inscription
There is an inscription in Sanskrit in the stepwell. It has date of Samvat 1553 dated Shraavana Vad 13th.

References

Stepwells in Gujarat
Anand district
1497 in Asia
15th century in India
Buildings and structures completed in 1497
Monuments of National Importance in Gujarat